The Inner Reaches of Outer Space is a 1986 book by mythologist Joseph Campbell, the last book completed before his death in 1987. In it, he explores the intersections of art, psychology and religion, and discusses the ways in which new myths are born. In writing the book, Campbell drew on transcripts of a series of lectures and conversations that he gave in San Francisco between 1981–1984, including legendary symposiums with astronaut Rusty Schweickart and with members of the Grateful Dead.

Originally published by Alfred van der Mark in 1986, the book was rereleased by Harper & Row in 1988. With the publication of the third edition by New World Library in 2002, The Inner Reaches of Outer Space became the second title in the Joseph Campbell Foundation's Collected Works of Joseph Campbell series.

References

External links
 Inner Reaches page on the JCF site

Books by Joseph Campbell
1986 non-fiction books
Comparative mythology
Mythology books
Psychology books
Religious studies books
Harper & Row books